Claudio Zulian (Campodarsego, Italy) is a filmmaker, video-artist, musician and writer. He has a PhD in Aesthetics, Science and Technology of the Arts by the University of Paris VIII and he directs the production company Acteon while working in Spain and France.

Work 

Claudio Zulian’s career has developed mainly in cinema, video installations and theatre. In 1993, he founded Acteon, a production company based in Barcelona, through which he produces his works. In 1998, the Contemporary Art Centre of Barcelona (Centre de Cultura Contemporània de Barcelona) hosted his exhibition Scenes from Raval (Escenas del Raval, 1998)  where he seeks to give visibility to the environment and people of this Barcelona neighborhood. At the same time, Claudio directed a documentary on the same subject that is also part of the installation.
 
In 2002, he published the book Horas de la ciudad (2002), a compilation of 24 short stories about the urban fabric and its inhabitants. His interest in showing the relationship between society and the media in a new light is present in his later works such as the photography installation Visions Of Carmel (Visions del Carmel, 2003) or the video installation The Future (L’avenir, 2004) – a documentary version was awarded worldwide - where he reflects on the daily life and hopes of a deindustrialised mining village in Northern France. In The Shifting City (A través del Carmel, 2006), planned both as a documentary and as a video installation, he received the Barcelona City Council Award and the Cinema National Award of Catalonia. Zulian’s interest in those people excluded from audiovisual image in media is again clear in his portrait of a Romanian community in Just Like Paradise (A lo mejor, 2007). The same happens in his return to the Carmel district, working with its teenagers in After Violence (Después de la violencia, 2009) as well as in It Won’t Be The Same (No será lo mismo, 2010). Moreover, this interest is reflected in his evocation of a better future in Enthusiasm (Entusiasmo, 2012), prepared in collaboration with several groups of inhabitants and immigrants of Salt (a neighborhood in Girona, Spain).
 
In 2011, Zulian’s documentary Fortuny & The Magic Lantern (Fortuny y la lámpara maravillosa, 2010) was selected at the AlJazeera International Documentary Film Festival and nominated for Best Art Documentary at the PriMED. It explores the relationships between East and West through Mariano Fortuny y Madrazo’s designs and sceneries.
In 2013, the Jeu de Paume in Paris hosted a retrospective of his works and presents his new creation: Power no power (2013)
In 2014, the fiction film Born (2014) was released, which is a drama set in the 18th century. Through the stories of three historical characters, the film explores the beginning of intimate and social interactions that are as true today as they were in the past.

Filmography & video installations 

1998 - Escenas del Raval (Scenes from Raval) – installation
2002 - Miradas extrañas (Strange Looks) – short film
2004 - Beatriz / Barcelona – feature film
2004 - L’avenir (The Future) – video installation and documentary
2006 - A través del Carmel (The Shifting City) – video installation and feature-length documentary
2007 - A lo mejor (Just like Paradise) – video installation and documentary
2009 - Después de la violencia (After Violence) – video installation
2010 - Fortuny y la lámpara maravillosa (Fortuny & the Magic Lantern) – documentary
2010 - No será lo mismo (It Won’t be the same) – video installation
2011 - 2031/2111 – video installation and documentary
2012 - Entusiasmo (Enthusiasm) – video installation
2013 - Power No Power – art film
2014 – Born – feature film

External links 
http://www.acteon.es/
https://web.archive.org/web/20150810233006/http://bornfilm.org/es/la-pelicula.php
http://www.imdb.com/name/nm2275657/
https://twitter.com/claudiozulian1
http://www.catalanfilmsdb.cat/es/profesionales/director/s/claudio-zulian/920/

References 

Year of birth missing (living people)
Living people
Italian film directors
Italian artists